Kevin is the anglicized form of the Irish masculine given name  (Latinized as ).

History
Saint Kevin (d. 618) founded Glendalough abbey in the Kingdom of Leinster in 6th-century Ireland. Canonized in 1903, he is one of the patron saints of the Archdiocese of Dublin.
Caomhán of Inisheer, the patron saint of Inisheer, Aran Islands, is properly anglicized Cavan or Kevan, but often also referred to as "Kevin". 

The name was rarely given before the 20th century. In Ireland an early bearer of the anglicised name was Kevin Izod O'Doherty (1823–1905) a Young Irelander and politician; it gained popularity from the Gaelic revival of the late nineteenth century, with Kevin Barry and Kevin O'Higgins prominent in the Irish revolutionary period.  Later it was "widely adopted throughout the English-speaking world",  surging in popularity during the 1950s. The sudden rise in popularity may be tied to actor Kevin McCarthy, who first became famous with Death of a Salesman (1951). In the United States the name's popularity peaked at rank 11 in 1963.  It has steadily decreased in popularity since then, but is still given with moderate frequency, at rank 89 as of 2016. Kevin fell out of the US Top 100 the following year and now ranks at Number 156. 
The name followed a similar trajectory in the United Kingdom, gaining popularity in the 1950s, peaking in the 1960s, gradually declining in the 1970s to 1980s, and falling out of the top 100 most popularly given names by the 1990s.

Oxford's A Dictionary of First Names suggests that anglicized Kevin may have influenced the adoption of Kelvin (in origin a river name) as a modern given name, which peaked in popularity at about the same time, albeit to a much lesser extent (peaking at rank 209 as of 1961 in the US).

In non-English-speaking Europe, the name picked up popularity in the 1980s via such American pop culture figures as actor Kevin Costner, singer Kevin Richardson, and, most prominently, Kevin McCallister, Macaulay Culkin's character in the Christmas comedy film Home Alone. "Kevin" was notorious for being extremely popular among lower-class parents during the end of 1980s to 2000s. The name peaked markedly in the early 1990s, reaching first rank in France (sometimes spelt Kévin)  during 1989–1994, during 1991–1992 in Switzerland and in 1991 in Germany. In German markets, Home Alone was released as "Kevin – Allein zu Haus". Especially in Germany, the name became associated with low social status, an attitude popularised in German journalism based on a 2009 master thesis on primary teachers' reactions to children's given names.  has become German short-hand for negative social preconceptions about trendy or exotic names.

People
Kevin Abernathy (born 1991), American editor and occasional host of shows on the Game Grumps platform
Kevin Abley (born 1935), Australian rules footballer
Kevin Agudelo (born 1998), Colombian footballer
Kevin Akpoguma (born 1995), German-Nigerian footballer
Kevin Alaníz (born 2003), Uruguayan footballer
Kevin Álvarez (born 1996), Honduran footballer
Kevin Álvarez (born 1999), Mexican footballer
Kevin Amuneke (born 1986), Nigerian footballer
Kevin Anderson (born 1960), American actor
Kevin Anderson (born 1986), South African tennis player
Kevin J. Anderson (born 1962), American science fiction author
Kevin Appier (born 1967), American baseball pitcher
Kevin Archer (born 1958), English musician and member of Dexy's Midnight Runners
Kevin Ashman (born 1959), English quiz player
Jean-Kévin Augustin (born 1997), French footballer
Kevin Austin Jr. (born 2000), American football player
Kevin Ayers (1944–2013), English songwriter
Kevin Bacon (born 1958), American actor
Kevin Balanta (born 1997), Colombian footballer
Kevin Beattie (1953–2018), English footballer
Kevin Begois (born 1982), Belgian footballer
Kevin Betsy (born 1978), English-Seychellois footballer
Kevin Behrens (born 1991), German footballer
Kevin-Prince Boateng (born 1987), German-born Ghanaian footballer
Kevin Bobson (born 1980), Dutch footballer
Kévin Boli (born 1991), French-Ivorian footballer
Kevin Bonifazi (born 1996), Italian footballer
Kevin Bouie (born 1971), American football player
Kevin Boyles (born 1967), Canadian volleyball player
Kevin Brands (born 1988), Dutch footballer
Kevin Bridges (born 1986), Scottish comedian
Kevin Broll (born 1995), German footballer
Kévin Bru (born 1988), French-Mauritian footballer
Kevin Bua (born 1993), Swiss footballer
Kevin Bukusu (born 2001), German footballer
Kevin Burke (born 1993), American football player
Kévin Cabral (born 1999), French footballer
Kevin Cannavò (born 2000), Italian footballer
Kevin Carlberg (born 1987), American musician
Kev Carmody (born 1946), Australian singer-songwriter
Kevin Carr (born 1958), English football goalkeeper
Kevin Carroll (born 1969), American football player
Kevin Carter (1960–1994), South African photographer
Kevin Cash (born 1977), American baseball manager
Dimitri Kévin Cavaré (born 1995), Guadeloupean-French footballer
Kevin Cheng (born 1969), American-born Hong Kong actor
Kevin Clash (born 1960), American puppeteer, director and producer
Kevin Cogan (born 1956), American racing driver
Kevin Coleman (born 1998), American soccer player
Kevin Conboy (born 1987), Danish footballer
Kevin Conrad (born 1990), German footballer
Kevin Conroy (1955–2022), American actor
Kévin Constant (born 1987), French-Guinean footballer
Kevin Corrigan (born 1969), American actor
Kevin Costner (born 1955), American actor
Kevin Daley (politician) (born 1957), American politician
Kevin Daley (born 1976), Panamanian basketball player
Kevin Danaher (1913–2002), Irish folklorist
Kevin Danso (born 1998), Austrian footballer
Kevin Davidson (born 1997), American football player
Kevin Dawson (born 1992), Uruguayan footballer
Kevin De Bruyne (born 1991), Belgian footballer
Kevin Deeromram (born 1997), Swedish born Thai footballer
Kévin Denkey (born 2000), Togolese footballer
Kévin Diaz (born 1983), French footballer
Kevin Diks (born 1996), Dutch footballer
Kevin Doherty (born 1958), Canadian judoka
Kevin Doyle (born 1983), Irish footballer
Kevin Durand (born 1974), Canadian actor
Kevin Durant (born 1988), American basketball player
Jean-Kévin Duverne (born 1997), French footballer
Kevin Eastman (born 1962), American comic book artist
Kevin Ehlers (born 2001), German footballer
Kevin Escamilla (born 1994), Mexican footballer
Kevin Faulconer (born 1967), American politician and former mayor of San Diego
Kevin Faulk (born 1976), American football player
Kevin Federline (born 1978), American dancer
Kevin Felida (born 1999), Dutch footballer
Kevin Fend (born 1990), Austrian footballer
Kevin Fertig (born 1977), American professional wrestler
Kevin Fickentscher (born 1988), Swiss footballer
Kevin Foley (born 1984), English-Irish footballer
Kevin Forster (born 1958), English long-distance runner
Kévin Fortuné (born 1989), French-Martiniquais footballer
Kevin Foster (born Kevin Bates; 1977), American murderer and leader of the "Lords of Chaos"
Kevin Frandsen (born 1982), American professional Baseball player
Kevin Freiberger (born 1988), German footballer
Kevin Friedland (born 1981), American soccer player
Kevin Friesenbichler (born 1994), Austrian footballer
Kevin Gallacher (born 1966), Scottish footballer
Kevin Galloway (born 1991), American-Iraqi basketball player
Kevin Gameiro (born 1987), French footballer
Kevin Garnett (born 1976), American basketball player
Kevin Gausman (born 1991), American baseball player
Kevin Ginkel (born 1994), American baseball player
Kevin Givens (born 1997), American football player
Kevin Goden (born 1999), German footballer
Kevin Gomez-Nieto (born 1994), Dutch footballer
Kévin Gomis (born 1989), French footballer
Kevin Gordon (born 1989), Australian Rugby player
Kevin Greening (1962–2007), British radio broadcaster
Kevin Gregg (born 1978), American baseball player
Kevin Großkreutz (born 1988), German footballer
Kevin Grund (born 1987), German footballer
Kevin Hansen (born 1979), German footballer
Kevin Harbottle (born 1990), Chilean footballer
Kevin Harlan (born 1960), American television and radio sports announcer
Kevin Harris (disambiguation), multiple people
Kevin Hart (born 1979), American actor and comedian
Kevin Harvick (born 1975), American race car driver
Kevin Haskins (born 1960), British drummer
Kevin Haverdink (born 1965), American football player
Kevin Hayes (born 1962), English cricketer
Kevin Hayes (born 1984), Irish hurler
Kevin Hayes (born 1992), American ice hockey player
Kevin Hector (born 1944), English footballer
Kevin Heinze (1928–2008), Australian television presenter
Kevin Herget (born 1991), American baseball player
Kevin Hingerl (born 1993), German footballer
Kevin Hoffmann (born 1995), German footballer
Kevin Hofland (born 1979), Dutch footballer and manager
Kévin Hoggas (born 1991), French footballer
Kevin Holzweiler (born 1994), German footballer
Kevin Ingreso (born 1993), German-Filipino footballer 
Kevin James (born 1965), American actor
Kevin Jansen (born 1992), Dutch footballer
Kevin Janssens (born 1986), Belgian footballer
Kevin Johnson (born 1966), American basketball player and politician
Kevin Jonas (born 1987), member of the Jonas Brothers
Kevin Kabran (born 1993), Swedish footballer
Kevin Kampl (born 1990), Slovenian footballer
Kevin Kauber (born 1995), Estonian footballer
Kevin Keegan (born 1951), English footballer and coach
Kevin Keelan (born 1941), English footballer
Kevin Keen (born 1967), English footballer and coach
Kevin Kerr (born 1990), German-Scottish footballer
Kevin Kiermaier (born 1990), American baseball player
Kevin Kilbane (born 1977), English-Irish footballer
Kevin Kilner (born 1958), American actor
Kevin King (American football) (born 1995), American football player
Kevin Kingston (born 1983), Australian Rugby League player
Kevin Kline (born 1947), American actor
Kevin Koffi (born 1986), Ivorian footballer
Kevin Korjus (born 1993), Estonian racing driver
Kévin Koubemba (born 1993), French-Congolese footballer
Kevin Kratz (born 1987), German footballer
Kevin Kraus (born 1992), German footballer
Kevin Martin Krygård (born 2000), Norwegian footballer
Kevin Kühnert (born 1989), German politician
Kevin Kunz (born 1992), German footballer
Kevin Kurányi (born 1982), Brazil-born German footballer
Kevin Kuske (born 1979), German bobsledder
Kevin Kyle (born 1981), Scottish footballer
Kevin James LaBrie (born 1963), Canadian singer
Kévin Lacroix (born 1984), French-Guadeloupean footballer
Kevin Lafrance (born 1990), French-Haitian footballer
Kevin Lankford (born 1998), German-American footballer
Kevin Lasagna (born 1992), Italian footballer
Kevin Le Gendre (living), British journalist, broadcaster
Kevin Lilly (born 1963), American football player
Kevin Lisbie (born 1978), English-Jamaican footballer
Kevin Lisch (born 1986), American basketball player
Kevin Long (disambiguation), multiple people
Kevin Love (born 1988), American basketball player
Kevin Luckassen (born 1993), Dutch footballer
Kevin Lundberg (born 1952), member of Colorado State Senate
Kevin Lynch (1956–1981), Irish republican, IRA hunger striker who died in 1981
Kevin López (born 1990), Spanish athlete
Kevin MacLeod (born 1972), American music composer
Kevin Macmichael (1951–2002), Musician, co-founder of pop-rock group Cutting Crew
Kevin Maek (born 1988), German footballer
Kevin Magee (1959–2003), American basketball player
Kevin Maggs (born 1974), Irish rugby player
Kevin Magnussen (born 1992), Danish racing driver
Kévin Malcuit (born 1991), French-Moroccan footballer
Kevin Malget (born 1991), Luxembourgian footballer
Kevin Martin (born 1983), American basketball player
Kevin Mason (born 1972), American football player
Kevin Mayer (born 1992), French decathlete
Kévin Mayi (born 1993), French footballer
Kevin Mbabu (born 1995), Swiss footballer
Kevin McCarthy (born 1965), California politician
Kevin McCarthy (1914–2010), American actor
Kevin McDonald (born 1961), Canadian comedian and actor
Kevin McDonald (born 1988), Scottish footballer
Kevin McHale (born 1957), American basketball player
Kevin McKenna (born 1980), Canadian footballer
Kevin McKidd (born 1973), Scottish film actor
Kevin McMahon (born 1972), American hammer thrower
Kevin Mensah (born 1991), Danish footballer
Kevin Mercado (born 1995), Ecuadorian footballer
Kevin Mirallas (born 1987), Belgian footballer
Kevin Mitchell (born 1981), Canadian water polo player
Kevin Mitnick (born 1963), computer security consultant and convicted hacker
Hulisani Kevin Mmbara (born 1979), South African political youth leader
Kevin Möhwald (born 1993), German footballer
Kevin Molino (born 1990), Trinidadian footballer
Kévin Monnet-Paquet (born 1988), French footballer
Kevin Moon (born 1998), Canadian singer and artist
Kevin Moran (born 1956), Irish footballer
Kevin Müller (born 1991), German footballer
Kevin Muscat (born 1973), Australian football manager
Kevin Nadal (born 1978), author, professor, activist, and comedian
Kevin Naiqama (born 1989), Australian-Fijian Rugby League player
Kevin Nanney (born 1989), American professional Super Smash Bros. Melee player known as PPMD
Kevin Nash (born 1959), American professional wrestler
Kévin N'Doram (born 1996), French footballer
Kevin Nealon (born 1953), American actor
Kevin Neufeld (born 1960), Canadian rower
Kevin Newman (disambiguation), multiple people
Kevin Newsome (born 1991), American football player
Kevin Nisbet (born 1997), Scottish footballer
Georges-Kévin Nkoudou (born 1995), French footballer
Kevin Nugent (born 1969), English football manager and former player
  (born 1953), Irish politician
Kevin O'Higgins (1892–1927), Irish politician
Kevin O'Leary (multiple people)
  (born 1979), Irish fiddler
Kévin Olimpa (born 1988), French-Martiniquais footballer
Kévin Oliveira (born 1996), Cape Verdean footballer
Kevin Ollie (born 1972), American basketball player
Kevin Oris (born 1984), Belgian footballer
Kevin Padlo (born 1996), American baseball player
Kevin Pannewitz (born 1991), German footballer
Kevin Paredes (born 2003), American soccer player
Kevin Parker (born 1986), Australian musician and member of Tame Impala
Kevin Peterson (born 1994), American football player
Kevin Pezzoni (born 1989), German footballer
Kevin Phillips (born 1973), English footballer
Kevin Pietersen (born 1980), English cricketer
Kevin Pillar (born 1989), major league baseball player
Kevin Plawecki (born 1991), American baseball player
Kevin Pollak (born 1957), American actor
Kevin Porter Jr. (born 2000), American basketball player
Kevin Quevedo (born 1997), Peruvian footballer
Kevin B. Quinn, American chief executive officer
Kevin Rader (American football) (born 1995), American football player
Kevin Ramírez (born 1994), Uruguayan footballer
Kevin Rauhut (born 1989), German footballer
Kevin Reynolds (born 1990), Canadian figure skater
Kévin Reza (born 1988), French racing cyclist
Kevin Richardson (born 1986), American college running back
Kevin Richardson (born 1962), English footballer
Kevin Richardson (born 1971), member of the Backstreet Boys
Kevin Michael Richardson (born 1964), American voice actor
Kévin Rimane (born 1991), French Guianan footballer
Kevin Robertson (born 1959), Water polo player
Kévin Rocheteau (born 1993), French footballer
Kévin Rodrigues (born 1994), French-Portuguese footballer
Kevin Rodrigues-Pires (born 1991), German-Portuguese footballer
Kevin Rolland (born 1989), French freestyle skier
Kevin D. Rome (born c. 1966), University administrator
Kevin Rose (born 1977), founder of Digg
Kevin Rowland (born 1953), musician and former frontman of the band Dexys Midnight Runners
Kevin Rudd (born 1957), 26th Prime Minister of Australia, Minister of Foreign Affairs
Kevin Rudolf (born 1983), American singer
Kevin Rüegg (born 1998), Swiss footballer
Kevin Sandoval (born 1962), Guatemalan footballer
Kevin Sandoval (born 1997), Peruvian footballer
Kevin Sangsamanan (born 1997), Thai footballer
Kevin Scheidhauer (born 1992), German footballer
Kevin Schindler (born 1988), German footballer
Kevin Schlitte (born 1981), German footballer
Kevin Schöneberg (born 1985), German footballer
Kevin Schulze (born 1992), German footballer
Kevin Schwantz (born 1964), American road racer
Kevin Seitzer (born 1962), American baseball player and coach
Kevin Sessa (born 2000), German footballer
Kevin Sheedy (born 1947), Australian footballer and Member of the Order of Australia
Kevin Sheedy (born 1959), Irish footballer
Kevin Shields (born 1963), musician
Kevin Simm (born 1980), English singer, songwriter, and musician who was a member of the pop group Liberty X
Kevin Sinfield (born 1980), English rugby league player and current captain of the Leeds Rhinos
Kevin Sitorus (born 1994), Indonesian basketball player
Kevin Smith (1963–2002), New Zealand actor
Kevin Smith (born 1970), American screenwriter, producer and director
Kevin Smith (baseball) (born 1996), American baseball player
Kévin Soni (born 1998), Cameroonian footballer
Kevin Sorbo (born 1958), American actor
Kevin Souter (born 1984), Scottish footballer
Kevin Spacey (born 1959), American actor
Kevin Steuke (born 1992), German footballer
Kevin Stevens (born 1965), American hockey player
Kevin Stewart (born 1993), English footballer
Kevin Stöger (born 1993), Austrian footballer
Kevin Strickland (born 1959), American wrongfully convicted of murder
Kevin Strong (born 1996), American football player
Kevin Strootman (born 1990), Dutch footballer
Kevin Stuhr Ellegaard (born 1983), Danish footballer
Kévin Théophile-Catherine (born 1989), French footballer
Kevin Tighe (born 1944), American actor
Kevin Tittel (born 1994), German footballer
Kevin Toliver II (born 1995), American football player
Kevin Toner (born 1996), Irish footballer
Kevin Trapp (born 1990), German footballer
Kevin Tumba (born 1991), Belgian-Congolese basketball player
Kevin Ray Underwood (born 1979), convicted murderer
Kevin Ullyett (born 1972), former professional tennis player from Zimbabwe
Kevin van Dessel (born 1979), Belgian footballer
Kevin van Diermen (born 1989), Dutch footballer
Kevin van Kippersluis (born 1993), Dutch footballer
Kevin van Veen (born 1991), Dutch footballer
Kevin Vandenbergh (born 1983), Belgian footballer
Kévin Vandendriessche (born 1989), French footballer
Kevin Varga (born 1996), Hungarian footballer
Kevin Vázquez Comesaña (born 1993), Spanish footballer
Kevin Vermeulen (born 1990), Dutch footballer
Kevin Vicuna (born 1998), Venezuelan professional baseball player
Kevin Vink (born 1984), Dutch footballer
Kevin Visser (born 1988), Dutch footballer
Kevin Vogt (born 1991), German footballer
Kevin Volland (born 1992), German footballer
Kevin Von Erich (born 1957), retired American professional wrestler
Kevin Walker (disambiguation), multiple people
Kevin Warwick (born 1954), British cybernetics professor at the University of Reading
Kevin Weidlich (born 1989), German footballer
Kevin White (1929–2012), American mayor of Boston 1968–1984
Kevin Wimmer (born 1992), Austrian footballer
Kevin Wölk (born 1985), German footballer
Kevin Wolze (born 1990), German footballer
Kevin Wright (born 1995), English-Sierra Leonean footballer
Kevin Youkilis (born 1979), American baseball player
Kevin Young (born 1961), English footballer
Kevin John Wasserman (born 1963), American guitarist for The Offspring (better known as "Noodles")
Kevin Žižek (born 1998), Slovenian footballer
Kévin Zohi (born 1997), Ivorian-Malian footballer

Fictional
Cousin Kevin, a character in the musical film Tommy
Kevin, a character in Frank Miller's Sin City yarns
Kevin, a character in Konami's role-playing game Suikoden IV
Kevin Keene, the title character from the cartoon Captain N: The Game Master
Kevin Arnold, the main character played by Fred Savage in the  American coming-of-age, comedy-drama television series The Wonder Years
Kevin Beckman, a character in the 2016 American supernatural comedy film Ghostbusters
Kevin Boggs, a character in 1990 American fantasy romance movie Edward Scissorhands
Kevin Butler, a fictional character in Sony's "It Only Does Everything" PS3 marketing campaign
Kevin, a character from the cartoon Ed, Edd n Eddy
Kevin Fischer, a character from the movie Final Destination 3
Kevin, a mobile crane from Thomas and Friends
Kevin, a flightless bird from Disney-Pixar's movie Up
Kevin, the leading minion in Minions
Kevin McCallister, the main character from the Home Alone franchise
Kevin the Gerbil, a British puppet seen in many productions alongside Roland Rat
Kevin, one of the four penguins from the VeggieTales spinoff 3-2-1 Penguins!
Kevin, the leader of the Jelly Spotters from SpongeBob SquarePants
Kevin Owens, a character from Mr. Belvedere
Kevin Phillips, a character in the 1994 American coming-of-age comedy-drama movie My Girl 2
Kevin Porter, a character in the novel and Netflix series 13 Reasons Why
Kevin Reynolds, a character from the Canadian animated TV series Supernoobs
Kevin Tran is a prophet on the American dark fantasy television series Supernatural
Kevin the Teenager, a character created and played by the comedian Harry Enfield

See also
 
 
 Caoimhe
 Caoimhin (Dungeons & Dragons), a fictional deity from Dungeons & Dragons
 German Kevinism
 Eugene – a name of Greek origin with a similar meaning
 Kavin – unrelated Tamil name
 Kevan
 Kevon
 List of Scottish Gaelic given names
 List of Irish-language given names

References

External links
 

English masculine given names
Irish masculine given names